Rut Ingeborg Maria Mueller Fernlund, (born 28 March 1935 in Stockholm - 30 May 2015) was a Swedish editor in chief. She was for almost 30 years the editor in chief for the publishers Norstedts.  She started working at Norstedts publishers on 1 April 1966. And as late as in 2013 more than 13 years after she reached her retirement age she still continued to work at the publishers, she had had her own office on every level plan of the publishers building. Fernlund  in 1995 won the Bokbranschens redaktörspris (book business editors award). In 2006 she was awarded by the Svenska Akademien.

References

1935 births
2015 deaths
Swedish editors
Swedish women editors
Swedish women journalists
Journalists from Stockholm